Emily Chalker (née Smith) is an Australian field hockey player. She has been selected to represent Australia in field hockey at the 2012, 2016 and 2020 Summer Olympics along with other competitions.

Personal
Chalker was born on 28 July 1992 in Crookwell, New South Wales and is from Southern Tablelands region of New South Wales. She attended St Mary's Primary School in New South Wales before going on to Crookwell High School.  She has deferred admissions to the University of New South Wales where she will major in Exercise Physiology.  She moved to Sydney in 2011 before moving to Perth, Western Australia where she now lives.

Field hockey
Chalker played junior hockey in Crookwell. She has held a field hockey scholarship at the New South Wales Institute of Sport (NSWIS) and the Australian Institute of Sport (AIS). She plays for the NSW Arrows in the Australian Hockey League, where she wears shirt number 3. She has played club field hockey for the Crookwell Golf Club, ANU, and the Park Panthers.

National team
When Adam Commens became the Hockeyroos' new coach in January 2011, Chalker was one of four players identified to develop the national side. She made her Australian debut in 2011, in a match against New Zealand in Hobart, Tasmania. In June 2012, she played in the Investec London Cup. She played in Australia's 1–4 loss to the Netherlands, scoring her team's only goal. In the 4–1 win against Ireland in the lead up London, she scored the team's second goal.  Her goal was the second of the tournament. , she had 22 caps with the Hockeyroos, and 7 international goals.

Chalker was named to the Australia women's national field hockey squad that competed at the 2012 Summer Olympics. As a teenager, she was the youngest member of the team.

Chalker qualified for the Tokyo 2020 Olympics. She was part of the Hockeyroos Olympics squad. The Hockeyroos lost 1-0 to India in the quarterfinals and therefore were not in medal contention.

References

External links
 
 
 
 
 
 
 
 

1992 births
Living people
Australian female field hockey players
Field hockey players at the 2012 Summer Olympics
Olympic field hockey players of Australia
Sportswomen from New South Wales
New South Wales Institute of Sport alumni
Field hockey players at the 2014 Commonwealth Games
Field hockey players at the 2016 Summer Olympics
Commonwealth Games medallists in field hockey
Commonwealth Games gold medallists for Australia
Female field hockey forwards
Field hockey players at the 2020 Summer Olympics
21st-century Australian women
Medallists at the 2014 Commonwealth Games
Medallists at the 2018 Commonwealth Games